Pat Cash and Mark Woodforde were the defending champions, but Cash chose not to compete this year.

Guy Forget and Cédric Pioline defeated Woodforde and Rick Leach in the final, 6–4, 6–3 to win the senior gentlemen's invitation doubles tennis title at the 2014 Wimbledon Championships.

Draw

Final

Group A
Standings are determined by: 1. number of wins; 2. number of matches; 3. in two-players-ties, head-to-head records; 4. in three-players-ties, percentage of sets won, or of games won; 5. steering-committee decision.

Group B
Standings are determined by: 1. number of wins; 2. number of matches; 3. in two-players-ties, head-to-head records; 4. in three-players-ties, percentage of sets won, or of games won; 5. steering-committee decision.

References
Draw

Seniors's Invitation Doubles